Luigi Gatti was an Italian weightlifter. He competed in the men's featherweight event at the 1920 Summer Olympics.

References

Year of birth missing
Year of death missing
Italian male weightlifters
Olympic weightlifters of Italy
Weightlifters at the 1920 Summer Olympics
Place of birth missing